Wiley is a Statutory Town in Prowers County, Colorado, United States.  The population was 405 at the 2010 Census.

Description
A post office called Wiley has been in operation since 1907. The community was named after W. M. Wiley, a first settler.

Geography
Wiley is located at  (38.155018, -102.719138).

Demographics

As of the census of 2010, there were 405 people, 162 households, and 112 families residing in the town. The racial makeup of the town was 83% White, 0.7%  African American, 0% Native American, 0.5%  Asian, 13.8% from  other races, and 1.7% from two or more races. Hispanic or Latino of any race were 25.2% of the population.

There were 162 households, out of which 35.8% had children under the age of 18 living with them, 51.2% were married couples living together, 10.5% had a female householder with no husband present, and 30.9% were non-families. 27.8% of all households were made up of individuals, and 17.9% had someone living alone who was 65 years of age or older.  The average household size was 2.5 and the average family size was 3.11.

In the town, the population was spread out, with 31.1% under the age of 18, 8.9% from 18 to 24, 34.0% from 25 to 44, 16.6% from 45 to 64, and 9.5% who were 65 years of age or older.  The median age was 32 years. For every 100 females, there were 90.2 males.  For every 100 females age 18 and over, there were 91.4 males.

The median income for a household in the town was $30,294, and the median income for a family was $32,143. Males had a median income of $30,156 versus $18,750 for females. The per capita income for the town was $13,115.  About 13.1% of families and 20.2% of the population were below the poverty line, including 26.2% of those under age 18 and 16.7% of those age 65 or over.

Transportation
Highway: Wiley is 0.2 miles east of U.S. Highway 287.

Rail: (Historical information)  Wiley was once served by the Arkansas Valley subdivision of the Acheson, Topeka and Santa Fe railway.

See also

 List of municipalities in Colorado

References

External links

 Town of Wiley contacts
 CDOT map of the Town of Wiley

Towns in Prowers County, Colorado
Towns in Colorado